William Beinart (born January 19, 1951 in Cape Town) is a South African historian and Africanist. He was educated at the University of Cape Town and School of Oriental and African Studies at the University of London. He taught at the University of Bristol from 1983 to 1997, and is now a professor of race relations and director of graduate studies at the African Studies Centre, St Antony's College, University of Oxford. His focuses are South Africa and the developments of racism.

Selected works

References 

1951 births
Living people
Writers from Cape Town
20th-century South African historians
University of Cape Town alumni
Fellows of St Antony's College, Oxford
Historians of South Africa
21st-century South African historians
Presidents of the African Studies Association of the United Kingdom